The Sons of Heaven is a science fiction novel by American writer Kage Baker.  It is the eighth in her series of novels about The Company.

The Company, formally known as Dr. Zeus Inc., exists in the 24th century but employs immortal cyborgs to recover and save valuable artifacts in the past.  The cyborgs are created by taking suitable children who would otherwise die and augmenting them with artificial components, physiological enhancements, and nanotechnology to continually repair their bodies so that they never age or die.  In exchange for the gift of health and immortality they work to preserve the past for sale in the future.

Some cyborgs are corrupt, plotting against the Company and each other for the prize they expect to gain when they finally reach the 24th century, when they believe they will take over from the mortals who run the Company.  Others despise mortals and plot to eliminate them.  More benign factions try to counter them.  Some individuals just want revenge.

Plot summary
The novel brings together the various threads begun during previous volumes.   It takes place mostly in the 24th century, over the final 20 years leading up to the Silence in 2355, the point beyond which the future of the Company is unknown.

The Botanist Mendoza, disabled and psychologically scarred by the attempts of the Company to destroy her, is dealing with the three incarnations of her lover, whom she first knew as Nicholas Harpole in the 16th century.  Two of them are imprisoned in her cyborg mind, while the third, the Victorian secret agent Edward Alton Bell-Fairfax, has taken over the body of the latest incarnation, Alec Checkerfield.  Edward is showing signs of megalomania.  The four of them, along with Alec's artificial intelligence known as Captain Morgan, are hiding in the deep past, hundreds of thousands of years before the present.  This is to allow them to recover from their trials and mount their own campaign against the company, for which they laid the foundations in The Machine's Child.

In the 24th century, Facilitator Joseph, having given up his quest for Mendoza after she disappeared, is putting the fix in again.  This time it is on behalf of his own foster-father, the Enforcer Budu, who is intent on destroying the Company in his own way.  To do this he will revive the army of Enforcers who have slept in Company bunkers for millennia, like heroes out of legend.  Strangely, William Randolph Hearst is a necessary part of this plan, even if Hearst would like to be the hero Roland.

Preserver Lewis, after being captured by the strange little humanoids known as Homo umbratilis, is slowly recovering from their attempts to kill him as a way of developing a new way to destroy the Company cyborgs.  He finds himself in a situation similar to that in the Arabian Nights: as long as he can keep telling stories, a princess of the little people will bring him food and water so he can repair himself.  Fortunately Lewis is a Literature Specialist and knows many stories...

Bugleg, the mortal Company scientist encountered in Sky Coyote, is now so afraid of his own creations, the cyborgs, that he allows himself to be persuaded to spread a new poison among them, the result of experimentation on Lewis.  His accomplice is a Hybrid, a genius born from both humans and Homo umbratilis.   Bugleg himself has some umbratilis in him, it seems.

Suleyman, Executive Facilitator for North Africa, and his protégé Latif, continue their efforts to seek out the places where the Company has buried its mistakes, and rescue missing cyborgs such as Lewis and Kalugin.

The rival power groups headed by Labienus and Aegeus gather their forces for the final showdown.  But things must be done correctly.  They face off across the table at the sumptuous Banquet At The End of Time.

Preserver Victor, who has realized he is a carrier of deadly diseases, designed to be activated when the Company needs them, creates his own appropriate form of retribution for what was done to him.

Above all the Silence looms.  After 11 a.m. California time on 9 July 2355, there are no more transmissions from the Company to its operatives in the past.  As the time approaches, the disruption becomes a self-fulfilling prophecy.  The mortal executives of the Company cower in a bunker, while the different cyborg factions schedule their various assaults on the Company for that time.

Origins of the title

In Sky Coyote the mortal servants of the base New World One address the male cyborgs as "Sons of Heaven", believing them to be gods who have preserved them from death.  However the theme of the Company novels is also tied to the legend of Zeus defeating his father Kronos, sometimes identified with Chronos, the personification of Time, to rule the rest of the Greco-Roman gods.  In turn the cyborgs are the sons and daughters of Dr. Zeus Inc.

There are further resonances in the relations between the cyborgs, as Budu is regarded as a father by Joseph, Victor, and Labienus, among others. Another more literal reference involves Mendoza's giving birth to twin sons, augmented human baby boys, to house the recorded consciousnesses of Alec Checkerfield and Nicholas Harpole, the first and third incarnations of Project Adonai, her now-immortal lover.

Novels about time travel
2007 American novels
Novels by Kage Baker
2007 science fiction novels
American science fiction novels
Fiction set in the 24th century
Tor Books books
Cyborgs in literature
Novels about reincarnation
Novels about artificial intelligence